Sead Gološ  (8 June 1969 – 4 November 2020) was a Bosnian architect.

Biography
Gološ was born in Sarajevo. He graduated in 1994 from the  Faculty of Architecture of the University of Sarajevo. From 1996 till 2001 he worked for the Sarajevo City Development Institute, then he joined the architectural firm GRUPA.ARH, for whom he also worked 5 years in Abu Dhabi and Dubai from 2011 to 2016. He was associate professor of architecture at the University of Sarajevo, and a member of the Council for urbanism, ecology and aesthetic planning of the City of Sarajevo. Gološ authored several landmark buildings in Sarajevo and beyond, changing the silhouette of the city in the 2010s. His works include:
Project for the new headquarters of Al Jazeera Balkans in Šip, Sarajevo
"Summit" Bau-Herc business building in Marijin Dvor (Maglajska 1), 2018
Sarajevo City Center (SCC) shopping centre, 2014
ARIA shopping centre, 2009
Merkur shopping centre in Otoka
Renovation of Hotel Europe, 2007
Bosmal City Centre (residential and commercial complex), 2001
tourism projects in Africa

He died of COVID-19 on 4 November 2020, at the Podhrastovi clinic in Sarajevo, where he had been hospitalized 20 days earlier.

Work

References

1969 births
2020 deaths
Architects from Sarajevo
University of Sarajevo alumni
Deaths from the COVID-19 pandemic in Bosnia and Herzegovina
20th-century architects
21st-century architects